Jared Irwin (January 19, 1768September 20, 1818) was a United States Representative from Pennsylvania.

Biography
Irwin was born in the Province of Georgia of British America. He was appointed commissioner for valuation of lands and dwellings and enumeration of slaves for the second division of Georgia on July 17, 1798.  He engaged in mercantile pursuits at Milton, Pennsylvania, and served as postmaster of Milton from June 1, 1802, to June 29, 1803.  He was sheriff of Northumberland County, Pennsylvania, from 1808 to 1812.  He was a member of the Pennsylvania House of Representatives in 1811, and served as colonel of the Fifth Rifle Regiment in the War of 1812.

Irwin was elected as a Republican to the Thirteenth and Fourteenth Congresses.  In 1817, Irwin assisted in the establishment and became a military leader of a short-lived revolutionary government, called the Republic of the Floridas, on Amelia Island.  He died in Fernandina, Florida in 1818, which was then a part of the Spanish-controlled territory of Florida (Spain ceded Florida to the U.S. in 1821 as a result of the Adams–Onís Treaty).

References

Further reading

The Political Graveyard

1768 births
1818 deaths
American filibusters (military)
American military personnel of the War of 1812
Democratic-Republican Party members of the United States House of Representatives from Pennsylvania
Members of the Pennsylvania House of Representatives
People from Georgia (U.S. state)
Pennsylvania postmasters
Pennsylvania sheriffs